CSTC may mean:

 Calcutta State Transport Corporation
 Confédération Syndicale des Travailleurs de Centrafrique
 Confédération Syndicale des Travailleurs du Congo
 Cortico-striato-thalamocortical circuit, also known as cortico-basal ganglia-thalamo-cortical loop, a type of neural circuit in the brain
 Combined Security Transition Command – Afghanistan